Next Big Thing is the tenth studio album from American country music artist Vince Gill. It was released in 2003 on MCA Nashville, and it features four singles: the title track, "Someday", "Young Man's Town", and "In These Last Few Days". These respectively reached #17, #31, #44 and #51 on the Billboard Hot Country Songs charts in 2003.

Track listing

Personnel 
As listed in liner notes.
 Vince Gill – lead and backing vocals, acoustic guitar, electric guitar, mandolin
 John Hobbs – keyboards, string arrangements (4, 5)
 Pete Wasner – keyboards
 Jim Hoke – accordion, autoharp, harmonica
 Mac McAnally – acoustic guitar
 Dean Parks – electric guitar
 Al Anderson – acoustic guitar (1, 3, 11), electric guitar (1, 3, 11)
 Tom Britt – slide guitar (1)
 John Hughey – steel guitar
 Willie Weeks – bass guitar
 Chad Cromwell – drums
 Eric Darken – percussion
 Stuart Duncan – fiddle
 Kirk Whalum – alto saxophone (1)
 Jim Horn – baritone saxophone (1), horn arrangements (1)
 Steve Herrman – trombone (1)
 Charles Rose – trumpet (1)
 The Nashville String Machine – strings (4, 5)

Harmony vocalists
 Bekka Bramlett (1, 11)
 Billy Thomas (1, 2, 4, 6, 10, 12)
 Harry Stinson (2, 12)
 Jeff White (3)
 Andrea Zonn (3)
 Michael McDonald (5)
 Kim Keyes (6, 10)
 Emmylou Harris (7)
 Dawn Sears (8, 14)
 Jenny Gill (9)
 Leslie Satcher (13)
 Lee Ann Womack (15)
 Amy Grant (17)

Charts

Weekly charts

Year-end charts

References

External links
 

2003 albums
Vince Gill albums
MCA Records albums